19 Love Ballads is a compilation album by Danish soft rock group Michael Learns to Rock. It was first released in summer 2001 by EMI in Asia, and in 2002 in Europe under the title 19 Love Songs. The album contains songs from Michael Learns to Rock's first five studio albums, including the new song "The Ghost of You".

Track listing

Charts

References

Michael Learns to Rock albums
2001 greatest hits albums